The Guernsey women's cricket team is the team that represents Guernsey, a Crown dependency in international women's cricket matches. Guernsey became an affiliate member in 2005 and an associate member of the International Cricket Council (ICC) in 2008.

In April 2018, the ICC granted full Women's Twenty20 International (WT20I) status to all its members. Therefore, all Twenty20 matches played between Guernsey women and another international side after 1 July 2018 are eligible for full WT20I status.

Women's Cricket Programme

Guernsey is developing a Cricket Programme for Women's and Girl Cricket. The details of this could be found here. Purple's Ladies and Green's Ladies are two different clubs present in Women's Club Cricket. Team details can be found here.

Records and statistics
International Match Summary — Guernsey Women

Last updated 25 June 2022

Twenty20 International 

T20I record versus other nations

Records complete to WT20I #1151. Last updated 25 June 2022.

See also
 List of Guernsey women Twenty20 International cricketers

References

External links
 Guernsey Cricket Board
 FemaleCricket-Guernsey
 ICC Cricket Guernsey

Cricket in Guernsey
Women's national cricket teams
Sports teams in Guernsey
Women's sport in Guernsey
W
C